Dreamworld or Dream World may refer to:

Amusement parks 
 Dreamworld (Australia), a theme park on the Gold Coast, Queensland, Australia
 Dream World (Thailand), an amusement park in Thanyaburi District, Pathum Thani Province, Thailand

Music 
 Dreamworld (band), a Swedish group 1995–1997
 "Dreamworld" (Midnight Oil song), 1988
 "Dreamworld" (Robin Thicke song), 2009
 "Dream World", a song by the Monkees from the 1968 album The Birds, The Bees & The Monkees
 "Dream World", a song by ABBA from the 2004 Thank You for the Music box set
 "Dreamworld", a song by Rilo Kiley from the 2007 album Under the Blacklight

Other uses
 Dream world (plot device), in fictional works
 Dreamworld, a dimension in the Dream Cycle fiction of H. P. Lovecraft
 Pokémon Dream World, part of Pokémon Black and White video games

See also

 Dream
 Dreamland (disambiguation)
 DreamWorks Pictures, an American film production company
 Fictional universe